Token resistance is a term, commonly referred to in the seduction community, denoting a rejection of advances, almost always of the sexual kind, with intention of actually engaging in the activity that was initially rejected.

Scientific validity 
One study has refuted the stereotype that most women engage in token resistance to sex, with results indicating that perhaps only a very small fraction of women and men have ever engaged in token resistance based on the definition stated within the study.

Token Resistance  is reported by women and men. There's results for men and women when they say "no" to something in a sexual context, the majority of times, it means no.

References 
 

Human behavior